Pogonatum nanum is a species of moss belonging to the family Polytrichaceae.

It is native to Europe.

References

Polytrichaceae